Histoire & Sociétés Rurales (History and Rural Societies) is an academic journal dedicated to rural history from prehistory to the present day. It was established in 1994 and is published biannually by the Association d'Histoire des Sociétés Rurales.

External links 
 

French-language journals
Publications established in 1994
History journals
Biannual journals